Hubertus Primus (born 1 September 1955) is a lawyer, journalist and manager. He was the editor-in-chief of the magazine test and is executive director and a member of the management board of Stiftung Warentest, the German consumer organisation.

Primus was born in Gersfeld (Rhön), West Germany, the son of a former mayor of Gersfeld.

After his law studies at the Free University of Berlin, where he qualified as a lawyer in 1986, Hubertus Primus worked for Rechtsmagazin für die Wirtschaft till 1988, followed by two years as a freelance journalist specialising in legal issues and taxes for the Industriemagazin and Süddeutsche Zeitung. He then worked for Stiftung Warentest's magazine Finanztest where he was promoted to its editor-in-chief in 1993. In 1999 he became the editor-in-chief of Stiftung Warentest's other magazine test and head of the Publications Division, as well as a member of the management board.

In March 2011, it was announced that Hubertus Primus would be appointed Stiftung Warentest's next executive director and successor to Werner Brinkmann as from 2012 – this was confirmed at the annual press conference on 12 May 2011.

Hubertus Primus and his wife, who was also born in Gerlsfeld, have four children. He is a board member of the Berlin sports club Zehlendorfer Wespen, responsible for marketing and public relations.

Selected publications
 Journalismus im Doppelpass von Internet und Zeitschrift, in: Der Kampf um die Öffentlichkeit – Wie das Internet die Macht zwischen Medien, Unternehmen und Verbrauchern neu verteilt, Verlag Luchterhand, Neuwied, Kriftel (2002), pp. 133 to 141
 Der GmbH-Geschäftsführer – Rechte und Pflichten – Gründung und Organisation – Bilanz und Steuern – Formulare und Kosten – Kleinbetriebe und Ein-Mann-GmbH, 5th edition, Heyne, München (2001)
 As editor: Start West – Ratgeber für Unternehmer und Existenzgründer in der DDR – Kredite, Leasing Kooperationen, Joint-Venture, Franchising, Firmenrecht, Service & Adressen, Geoconsult GmbH, Neu-Isenburg (1990)

External links
 Portrait of Hubertus Primus at kress.de

1955 births
Living people
People from Fulda (district)
German journalists
German male journalists
Print editors
Consumer rights activists
German male writers
German magazine editors